Bjørn Otto Bragstad (born 5 January 1971) is a former football defender from Norway.

Club career
Bragstad came through the youth ranks at Rosenborg before making his senior debut in the 1989 season. He scored 26 goals in 194 matches for them. In 2000, he joined English team Derby. Playing just 12 league matches, and scoring twice in a League Cup tie against West Bromwich Albion, he failed to make a significant impact at the club and went on loan to Birmingham where he would only play three matches the following season. He eventually departed Derby halfway through the 2002–03 season. He spent the rest of his career in Austria with Bregenz before retiring in the summer of 2004.

International career
He made his debut for Norway in a January 1999 friendly match against Israel and was capped 15 times. His last international match was an August 2000 friendly against Finland. Bragstad was a squad player at the Euro 2000 and played in all three matches for Norway.

Honours
Rosenborg BK
Norwegian top division: 1990, 1992, 1993, 1994, 1995, 1997, 1998, 1999, 2000
Norwegian Cup: 1992, 1995, 1999

Personal life
He is the father of Emilie Bragstad.

References

External links
 

1971 births
Living people
Footballers from Trondheim
Norwegian footballers
Norway international footballers
UEFA Euro 2000 players
Rosenborg BK players
Derby County F.C. players
Birmingham City F.C. players
SW Bregenz players
Premier League players
Eliteserien players
Expatriate footballers in England
Expatriate footballers in Austria
Norwegian expatriate sportspeople in Austria
Norwegian expatriate sportspeople in England
Norwegian expatriate footballers
Association football defenders